Judgment! is a studio album by American jazz pianist Andrew Hill, recorded and released in 1964 on Blue Note Records. Accompanied by drummer Elvin Jones, bassist Richard Davis and vibraphonist Bobby Hutcherson - Hill weaves his music around complex harmonic structures.

The pieces
The first track, "Siete Ocho", meaning "Seven Eight", is in 7/8. "Flea Flop" was named "for the first notes of the melody, which seemed to suggest a jumping flea. This is also dedicated to the hotels and motels that jazz sidemen are obliged to stay in all over the country." The composition "Yokada Yokada" was named after the song "Yakety Yak", referring to "senseless dialogue between people," whilst "Alfred" was dedicated to producer Alfred Lion because of his "natural understanding of jazz in general." The title track "Judgment" was inspired by a poem written by Hill's wife, Lavern. "Reconciliation" addresses "the adjustment every musician has to make to achieve unity and harmony with the rest of the group."

Track listing
All compositions by Andrew Hill
 "Siete Ocho" - 8:58
 "Flea Flop" - 7:21
 "Yokada Yokada" - 5:17
 "Alfred" - 7:04
 "Judgment" - 6:53
 "Reconciliation" - 7:24
 "Yokada Yokada" [alternate take] - 5:12 Bonus track on CD

Personnel
Andrew Hill - piano
Bobby Hutcherson - vibraphone
Richard Davis - bass
Elvin Jones - drums

References

1964 albums
Andrew Hill albums
Blue Note Records albums
Albums produced by Alfred Lion
Post-bop albums
Modal jazz albums
Avant-garde jazz albums
Albums recorded at Van Gelder Studio